Elizabeth Wilson (born 1936) is a British independent researcher and writer best known for her commentaries on feminism and popular culture. She was a professor at London Metropolitan University and the London College of Fashion and is the author of several non-fiction books and fiction books. In particular, she writes on feminist politics and policy; the history of fashionable dress and dress as cultural practice; the cultures of urban life; and high culture and popular culture, especially architecture and film. Her novels The Twilight Hour, War Damage and The Girl in Berlin are published by Serpent’s Tail. She has written for The Guardian and New Statesman and was a frequent broadcaster on BBC Radio 4.

Life 
In her early life, Elizabeth Wilson's family was employed in modest positions running the British Empire. Elizabeth Wilson was educated at St Paul's Girls' School, London, St Anne's College, Oxford and the London School of Economics where she trained as a psychiatric social worker. She worked as a social worker for 10 years, but was eventually repelled by the conservative ethos and morality surrounding psychoanalysis. She then moved on to a career in academia.

Elizabeth Wilson and her partner Angela [Weir] Mason were both active women's liberation movement figures in the UK. They were members of the Communist Party 1974-1990 and were campaigners for YBA Wife [Why Be a Wife?] - the Women's Liberation Movement Campaign for Legal and Financial Independence, Rights of Women, the National Abortion Campaign, and the women's refuge movement - Women's Aid. In 1984, Wilson became a co-parent when Angela [Weir] Mason gave birth to their daughter. Together with Angela [Weir] Mason she wrote ‘Hidden Agendas: Theory, Politics, and Experience in the Women's Movement', published in 1986.

Wilson was a prominent member of the campaign group Feminists Against Censorship. Wilson wrote for 'underground' papers of the late 1960s and early 1970s, eg., Frendz, Come Together and Red Rag. She was a founder member of the editorial group of Feminist Review 1979–1985 and a member of the editorial board of the New Left Review 1990–1992. From 1987 to 2001 Elizabeth taught cultural studies at the University of North London (now London Metropolitan University). From 1990–1993 she was a member of the Executive Committee of Liberty (the National Council for Civil Liberties). Later in life, Elizabeth joined the Green Party. She also wrote for the Guardian, London, the New Statesman and New Left Review as well as broadcasting extensively for television and radio.

Her books, Adorned in Dreams: Fashion and Modernity,  The Sphinx in the City: Urban Life the Control of Disorder and Women, Bohemians: The Glamorous Outcasts, Cultural Passions and Love Game: A History of Tennis from Victorian Pastime to Global Phenomenon may appear to cover a wide range of topics. They are united however by a single theme:  the importance of the aesthetic in modern life. Wilson is interested in fashion as the way in which individuals and groups can use clothing to make statements, individual and collective, to assert or to challenge authority. Her texts describe how garments are beautiful as objects in their own right while also forming a history of objects that is, in the end, the history of civilization.

For the most part, Elizabeth Wilson’s fiction writing is a series of linked crime novels set in the late 1940s and 1950s exploring the changed world of Britain and specifically London after 1945. Titles include: The Twilight Hour, War Damage, The Girl in Berlin, and She Died Young.

Education and career 
Schooling
 St Paul’s Girls’ School, London W6 (scholar)
 St Anne’s College Oxford
 London School of Economics and Political Science
 Birkbeck College, University of London
 BA Oxon English Class II
 Certificate of Social Administration LSE
 Diploma of Mental Health (distinction) LSE
 BA French and German Class I

Employment
 1996 – 2001 Professor of Cultural Studies, London Metropolitan University
 2001 – Professor Emeritus Cultural Studies London Metropolitan University
 2004 – 2013 Visiting Professor London College of Fashion, University of the Arts, London
 1996 – 2001 Senior Lecturer and Principal Lecturer in social policy and Professor of Cultural Studies, University of North London (now London Metropolitan )

Visiting lectureships and professorships

 Stanford University 1985
 Goldsmiths College 2003-2006
 Stockholm University 2007 – 2010

Voluntary activity

 1998 – 2005 Member Isaac and Tamara Deutscher Memorial Prize Board member
 2008 – 2010 Volunteer English National Operas
 2010 – LEA Governor Haverstock School, London Borough of Camden
 2012 – Trustee, London Library

Reception 
In an article for the journal Historical Materialism, Stefan Kipfer and Kanishka Goonewardena write the following about her non-fiction book The Sphinx in the City: Urban Life, the Control of Disorder and Women,"Elizabeth Wilson’s socialist-feminist approach to the city covers terrain similar to Berman’s urban Marxism. Also strongly inflected by Walter Benjamin and Jane Jacobs, her The Sphinx in the City is an impressively wide-ranging survey of the gendered and sexualised contradictions of urban modernity. Explicating these contradictions takes Wilson on an intellectual journey from Victorian London and Haussmann’s Paris to turn-of-the- century Vienna, Berlin, Prague, Chicago and New York, and mid-century New York City. More than Berman, however, Wilson makes it clear that Euro-American metropolitan life has been infused with imperial culture and is co-defined by the world-wide experience of planning colonial and Third World cities such as Delhi, Lusaka and São Paulo. The ambiguous promise the urban experience represents for socialist feminism must thus take into account the world-wide, uneven character of modern urbanisation."Elizabeth Wilson's fiction has been well received. Her third novel, The Twilight Hour had reviews in Time Out London, Bookslut, The Independent, Tangled Web UK, and BookReview.com.

Works

Books 
 Love Game, 2014
 Cultural Passions, 2013
 Adorned in Dreams, 2003
 Body Dressing, 2001 (co-editor with Jo Entwistle)
 Bohemians: The Glamorous Outcasts, 2000
 The Contradictions of Culture, 2000
 Defining Dress, 1999 (co-editor with Amy de la Haye)
 The Lost Time Cafe, 1997
 Pornography and Feminism: The case Against Censorship, 1992 (co-editor with Gillian Rogerson)
 Chic Thrills: A Fashion Reader, 1992 (co-editor with Juliet Ash)
 The Sphinx in the City: Urban Life, the Control of Disorder and Women, 1992 (translated into German and French)
 Through the Looking Glass, 1989 (with Lou Taylor)
Hidden Agendas: Theory, Politics and Experience in the Women's Movement, 1986 (with Angela Weir)
 Adorned in Dreams: Fashion and Modernity, 1985 (translated into German, Spanish, Portuguese, Swedish, Danish and Italian)
 What is to be Done about Violence Against Women, 1982
 Only Halfway to Paradise: Women in Postwar Britain, 1980
 Women and the Welfare State, 1977

Fiction and essays 
 She Died Young, 2015
 The Girl in Berlin, 2012
 War Damage, 2009
 The Twilight Hour, 2006
 The Lost Time Cafe, 1997
 Hallucinations: Life in the Postmodern City, 1988
 Mirror Writing, 1983

References

External links 
http://www.elizabethwilson.net/
https://www.theguardian.com/profile/elizabeth-wilson
https://newleftreview.org/issues/i148/articles/angela-weir-elizabeth-wilson-the-british-women-s-movement

1936 births
Living people
Urban theorists
British LGBT rights activists
Alumni of the London School of Economics
British lesbian writers
Women crime fiction writers
Communist women writers
British women novelists
British women historians